The Markham Farmstead near Conde, South Dakota was listed on the National Register of Historic Places in 1990.  It is located at the junction of Spink County's County Roads 4 and 7.  It has also been known as B.C. Evans Farm.

References

National Register of Historic Places in South Dakota
Spink County, South Dakota
Historic districts on the National Register of Historic Places in South Dakota